Anna Krasteva (born 17 May 1977) is a Bulgarian former short track speed skater. She competed in two events at the 2002 Winter Olympics. Krasteva has won three bronze medals in 3000 metre relay at the 1999, 2001, and 2003 World Championships, respectively.

References

External links
 

1977 births
Living people
Bulgarian female short track speed skaters
Olympic short track speed skaters of Bulgaria
Short track speed skaters at the 2002 Winter Olympics
People from Ihtiman
Sportspeople from Sofia Province